Richard Watts Jr. (1898–1981) was an American theatre critic.

Born in Parkersburg, West Virginia, Watts was educated at Columbia University. He began his writing career as the film critic for the New York Herald Tribune before assuming the post of the newspaper's drama critic in 1936.

After spending World War II in China as a war correspondent, Watts became the theatre critic for the New York Post, a position he held until a few years prior to his death from cardiac arrest. For the Post he also wrote a regular column entitled "Random Notes on This and That."

External links
New York Times funeral notice

1898 births
1981 deaths
People from Parkersburg, West Virginia
Columbia University alumni
American theater critics
New York Herald Tribune people
New York Post people